Yusof Ishak Secondary School (YISS) is a co-educational government secondary school located in Punggol, Singapore. The school is named after Yusof Ishak, the first President of Singapore.

History
The school was started under the name Jubilee Integrated Secondary School in 1965, with 984 pupils in two streams, English and Malay. It was officially opened as Yusof Ishak Secondary School at Jubilee Road on 29 July 1966, named after the first President of Singapore, Yusof Ishak. The school moved to Bukit Batok in December 1998 and inaugurated on 29 July 2000 by Ong Chit Chung, Member of Parliament for Bukit Timah GRC.

YISS was the first school to top the value-added ranking in both Express and Normal Streams. In 2010, it was evaluated as value-added, and its National Cadet Corps (Land) Girls unit received the Best Unit award. 

In 2018, in response to declining student numbers at Bukit Batok and rising demand in Punggol, the school announced its relocation to Punggol and plans to cease new intakes. The school began receiving new students at its relocated Punggol campus from 2022.

School identity and culture

Uniform 
Students wear a white shirt with the school badge worn on the left collar, coupled with dark blue shorts (for male lower secondary students), pants (for male upper secondary students), or skorts (for females). The school tie is worn on formal school functions.

Core values 
The six values of YISS are Integrity, Self Respect, Purpose, Inquisitiveness, Resilience and Empathy. The school motto is Ilmu Suluh Hidup, which means "knowledge is the light of life" in Malay.

Co-curricular activities
Every YISS student is required to have a co-curricular activity. The CCAs are divided into categories: Uniformed Groups, Visual and Performing Arts, Physical Sports and Clubs & Societies. The following are the official CCAs of the school:

Uniformed Groups

 NCC
 NPCC
Visual and Performing Arts
 Choir
 Concert Band
 Modern Dance
 Chinese Orchestra

Physical Sports
 Wushu
 Table Tennis
 Badminton
 Basketball (Boys)
 Fencing

Clubs & Societies
 Infocomm/Media
 Robotics
 STEM Club
 ELDDS
 Art

References

External links
 Official website

Educational institutions established in 1965
Secondary schools in Singapore
Punggol
1965 establishments in Singapore